John David Bessler (born October 23, 1967) is an American attorney and academic. He is a professor of law at the University of Baltimore School of Law and an adjunct professor at the Georgetown University Law Center. He is the husband of U.S. Senator Amy Klobuchar.

Education
Bessler attended Loyola Catholic School in Mankato, Minnesota, and received his B.A. in political science from the University of Minnesota, J.D. from Indiana University Maurer School of Law, M.F.A. in creative writing from Hamline University and his M.St. in international human rights law from Oxford University. Bessler studied international human rights law at Oxford University and wrote articles for the Indiana Law Journal and the Arkansas Law Review.

Legal career
Bessler previously taught at the University of Minnesota Law School and The George Washington University Law School, where he specialized in death penalty issues. In addition, Bessler clerked for U.S. Magistrate Judge John M. Mason of the District of Minnesota and practiced law as a partner at Kelly & Berens, P.A. Bessler currently is a tenured associate professor at the University of Baltimore School of Law, where he teaches civil procedure, contracts, capital punishment, international human rights law, and lawyering skills.

Writings
He is a leading authority on capital punishment, having written five books and various book chapters and articles on the subject. Two of Bessler's books, Death in the Dark: Midnight Executions in America and Legacy of Violence: Lynch Mobs and Executions in Minnesota, were Minnesota Book Award finalists. He also authored Writing for Life: The Craft of Writing for Everyday Life. His most recent book is The Birth of American Law: An Italian Philosopher and the American Revolution (Carolina Academic Press, 2014), which discusses the influence of the Italian jurist and philosopher Cesare Beccaria on the founders of the United States. Bessler also has contributed to one event, a teleforum entitled "Execution Methods and Deciding Implementation of the Death Penalty," held by The Federalist Society, a conservative and libertarian organization.

Personal life 
Bessler is married to Amy Klobuchar, a politician and lawyer who currently serves as a U.S. Senator for Minnesota. They have a daughter. On March 23, 2020, Klobuchar announced via Instagram that Bessler had contracted COVID-19 and was later hospitalized.

References

External links 
 University of Baltimore School of Law Faculty Profile
 

Spouses of Minnesota politicians
University of Minnesota College of Liberal Arts alumni
University of Minnesota faculty
Alumni of the University of Oxford
Amy Klobuchar
Indiana University alumni
Minnesota lawyers
1960 births
Living people
Hamline University alumni
George Washington University faculty
American legal scholars
Georgetown University Law Center faculty
Anti–death penalty activists
University of Baltimore faculty
21st-century American male writers
Minnesota Democrats
20th-century American lawyers
21st-century American lawyers
21st-century American non-fiction writers
Writers from Minnesota